Tariq Mahmood or Mehmood may refer to:

Tariq Mahmood (cricketer)
Tariq Mahmood (detainee)
Tariq Mahmood (judge)
Tariq Mehmood